Madinah Wilson-Anton (born 1993) is an American politician serving in the Delaware House of Representatives for district 26 as a Democrat. She is the first practicing Muslim elected to the Delaware General Assembly. She defeated incumbent John Viola in the Democratic primary and later won the general election for the seat in 2020.

Early life and education 
Wilson-Anton grew up in Newark, Delaware; she graduated from the Charter School of Wilmington before continuing on to the University of Delaware. In March 2017, CBSN quoted Wilson-Anton when the Biden Institute was founded at the University of Delaware. Wilson-Anton, then a graduate student, welcomed the move, stating that Biden's work had inspired her, and she planned to work in government upon graduation. In 2020, she earned a Master of Public Policy, also from the University of Delaware.

Career 
Wilson-Anton worked as a legislative aide for two members of Delaware legislature, Earl Jaques of the 27th district, and John Viola of the 26th district. In October 2019 Jaques mocked Eric Morrison, his rival for the Democratic nomination for his seat, for holding a fundraiser where he performed as a drag queen. The News Journal republished a tweet in which Wilson-Anton criticized her former boss. Jaques formally apologized.

As a Legislature Fellow, she voiced disappointment after two legislators protested an Islamic prayer.

She is a policy analyst at the Biden Institute at the University of Delaware.

Delaware House of Representatives

2020 Delaware House campaign 
Wilson-Anton's 2020 campaign focused on education, housing, and health care, and she has stated support for a state-level Green New Deal. Her campaign was endorsed by the Working Families Party. When Wilson-Anton announced she was competing for the Democratic nomination reporters noted that, if elected, she would be the first practicing Muslim to serve in the Delaware legislature.

She defeated 22-year incumbent representative John Viola in the primary election by 43 votes. Because the district is solidly-Democratic, Wilson-Anton won the November general election with minimal opposition and became the first practicing Muslim elected to Delaware's state legislature.

Christian Century noted that four other states elected their first Muslim legislators, in 2020.  Iman Jodeh, Christopher Benjamin, Mauree Turner and Samba Baldeh were the first Muslim legislators in Colorado, Florida, Oklahoma and Wisconsin, respectively.

Tenure
Wilson-Anton's first bill expanded public school religious holiday policies to include minority faith holidays like Eid al-Fitr.

Along with State Senator Sarah McBride, Wilson-Anton called on fellow State Representative Gerald Brady to resign after he made racist comments toward Asian-Americans in a leaked email.

Electoral history

2020

References

External links
 Legislature website
 Campaign website

1993 births
Living people
Democratic Party members of the Delaware House of Representatives
African-American Muslims
Women state legislators in Delaware
African-American state legislators in Delaware
African-American women in politics
Women in Delaware politics
21st-century American politicians
21st-century American women politicians
University of Delaware alumni
21st-century African-American women
21st-century African-American politicians